Zemlyane is a Soviet and later Russian rock band, formed in Leningrad in 1978. The band achieved great popularity in the early 1980s and remains active.

A key artist in the VIA (vocal-instrumental ensemble) wave of Soviet music, Zemlyane was one of the first officially state-recognized bands in the USSR to feature elements of rock music. Zemlyane mixed hard rock music with synthpop. Most of their lyrics deal with risk, courage, and masculinity. They sang about cosmonauts, stunts, pilots, and sailors.

In 2009, Zemlyane's 1980s hit "Trava u doma" became the first official anthem of the Russian space program. Russian cosmonauts have traditionally taken this song with them when getting assigned for orbital deployments.

Biography
Zemlyane was formed in 1968 by students of Leningrad Radiopolytechnical College. Followers of bands such as Deep Purple, Iron Butterfly, and Emerson, Lake & Palmer, they played mainly cover versions of these bands' music until 1974 when they started creating compositions of their own.

In 1978 Zemlyane stopped performing on stage for several months for reasons of reorganization and rest.

Their former administrator Andrey Bolshev and drummer of rock band April, Vladimir Kiselev (ru), decided to take advantage of this situation. They put together totally different musicians passing them off as real Zemlyane. Protests from original Zemlyane rock band were completely ignored. The accession of the Soviet Union to the Universal Copyright Convention, which became effective on May 27 was formal and no one dared to sue for copyright violation or infringement.

Thus, in 1979 two groups of musicians performed under the same name 'Zemlyane': Zemlyane led by Myasnikov (keyboards) and Zemlyane promoted by Kiselev and Bolshev.

In 1980 original Zemlyane lineup was Sergey Skachkov (keytar, vocals), Igor Romanov (guitar, vocals), Boris Aksenov (bass guitar) and Vladimir Kiselev (drums), usually accompanied by session members as well. Kiselev was also Zemlyane's sound producer and manager ('artistic director', in terms of the time). In the early 1980s the band released several hits such as 'Trava u doma', 'Kaskadery', 'Vzletnaya polosa', among others. 'Trava u doma' featured in soundtrack of popular cartoon series Nu, pogodi!.

In 1987, Zemlyane opened for Uriah Heep at the Olympic Stadium in Moscow.

The band went on hiatus by the beginning of the next decade, but was revived by Sergey Skachkov in 1994 with relatively new lineup. Another former Zemlyane member, Igor Romanov, now plays in Alisa. A copyright dispute between Skachkov and Kiselev arose when Kiselev (as producer) created a band of young musicians, unrelated to old Zemlyane, which used Zemlyane's name and performed its old hits. The dispute was eventually settled in 2009 in favor of Skachkov.

In 2015 "Zemlyane" supported annexation of Crimea and gave a concert in Sevastopol, which was annexed by Russia.
It supported the 2022 Russian invasion of Ukraine, and the Presidential Administration of Russia put the band on the list of singers who were recommended to be invited to state-sponsored events.

Discography 

FULL DISCOGRAPHY OF OFFICIAL RELEASES AND MAGNIT-ALBUMS

 1979 — «Красный Конь» / EP, ВФГ «Мелодия» 
 1980 — Владимир Мигуля & группа «ЗЕМЛЯНЕ» / LP, ВФГ «Мелодия»
 1981/82 — «Концертная Программа, LIVE 1981-1982» / Magnit-Albom, tape
 1981 — «Земляне 81» / Magnit-Albom, tape
 1982 — «Земляне 82» / Magnit-Albom, tape
 1982 — «Концерт в Харькове, 1982» / Magnit-Albom, tape  
 1982 — «Концерт в Кургане, 05.12.1982» / Magnit-Albom, tape  
 1982 — «Концерт в ЛДМ, Ленинград, март 1982» / Magnit-Albom, tape
 1982 — «Карате» / EP, ВФГ «Мелодия»
 1983 — «Каскадеры» / EP, ВФГ «Мелодия»
 1983 — «Дельтаплан» / EP, ВФГ «Мелодия»
 1983 — «Крепче Держись, Сынок» / Magnit-Albom, tape
 1984 — «Путь Домой» / Magnit-Albom, tape
 1984/85 — «Ау, Лабиринт» / Magnit-Albom, tape
 1985 — «Концерт в СКК им.Ленина, Ленинград, 20.02.85» / Magnit-Albom, tape  
 1987 — «Радость и Печаль» / Magnit-Albom, tape
 1987 — «День Рождения Земли» / MC, LP, ВФГ «Мелодия»
 1988 — «Дымкою  Мая» / EP ВФГ «Мелодия»
 1988/90 — «По Закону Земли» / Magnit-Albom, tape
 1988/90 — «Мужчины…» / Magnit-Albom, tape
 1989/92 — «Русские, русские, русские» (С.Скачков) / Magnit-Albom, tape
 1989/92 — «Сладкая Игра» («Восточный Экспресс») / Magnit-Albom, tape
 1994 — «Лучшие Хиты» best / 2CD, «NP.Records»
 1995 — «Трава у Дома» best / CD, MC, «ZeKo Records»
 1995 — «Мы Люди» best / CD, МС, «ZeKo Records»
 1998 — «Лучшие Песни» (remake) / MC,CD, «CD-MediaRecords / ZeKo Records»
 2000 — «SOS» (С.Скачков) / CD, МС, «ZeKo Records»
 2002 — «Grand Collection» best / CD, МС, «Квадро Диск»
 2003 — «Энциклопедия Российского Рока» best / CD, «Grand Records»
 2003 — «Лучшие Песни» best / CD, МС, «Мистерия Звука»
 2008 — «Холод Души» (С.Скачков) / CD, «Navigator Records»
 2008 — «Концерт-презентация сольного альбома «Холод Души», ККЗ "Мир" 02.02.2008» (С.Скачков) / 2CD, 2DVD, «GMC»
 2009 — «ЗЕМЛЯНЕ & SUPERMAX / Сергей Скачков & Kurt Hauenstein» / CD, «НП.ЦДЮТ.ЗЕМЛЯНЕ / Союз»
 2010 — «Символы Любви» (С.Скачков) / CD, «НП.ЦДЮТ.ЗЕМЛЯНЕ / CD'Maximum»
 2014 — «Половина Пути» (С.Скачков) / CD, «ООО ПЦ Сергея Скачкова / ООО М2»

References

External links

Official Zemlyane website (in Russian)
Official discography Zemlyane (in Russian)

Musical groups established in 1978
Musical groups from Saint Petersburg
Russian hard rock musical groups
Russian pop rock music groups
Soviet rock music groups
Soviet vocal-instrumental ensembles